Paweł Wiesiołek (born 13 August 1991) is a Polish athlete competing in the decathlon. He represented his country at the 2015 World Championships in Beijing finishing 17th and competed in the 2016 Summer Olympics.
 
His main personal bests are 8204 points in the decathlon (Kraków 2019) and 6133 points in the indoor heptathlon (Toruń 2021).

Competition record

Personal bests
Outdoor
100 metres – 10.74 (+1.0 m/s) (Warsaw 2016)
400 metres – 48.55 (Beijing 2015)
1500 metres – 4:31.34 (Cracow 2019)
110 metres hurdles – 14.28 (+0.7 m/s) (Warsaw 2017)
High jump – 2.12 (Götzis 2017)
Pole vault – 5.00 (Warsaw 2020)
Long jump – 7.61 (+1.0 m/s) (Götzis 2015)
Shot put – 15.26 (Doha 2019)
Discus throw – 50.30 (Warsaw 2019)
Javelin throw – 61.36 (Warsaw 2015)
Decathlon – 8204 (Cracow 2019)
Indoor
60 metres – 6.94 (Toruń 2021)
1000 metres – 2:41.39 (Spała 2015)
60 metres hurdles – 8.10 (Spała 2015)
High jump – 2.07 (Spała 2013)
Pole vault – 5.20 (Toruń 2021)
Long jump – 7.63 (Prague 2015)
Shot put – 15.63 (Toruń 2021)
Heptathlon – 6133 (Toruń 2021)

References

External links

Polish decathletes
Living people
People from Wyszków
1991 births
Polish male athletes
World Athletics Championships athletes for Poland
Athletes (track and field) at the 2016 Summer Olympics
Olympic athletes of Poland
Athletes (track and field) at the 2020 Summer Olympics